Mussidia nigrivenella is a species of snout moth in the genus Mussidia. It was described by Ragonot in 1888. It is found in Ivory Coast, Kenya, Niger, South Africa and Mozambique.

The larvae feed on Zea mays, Theobroma cacao and Gossypium species.

References

Moths described in 1888
Phycitinae
Moths of Africa
Taxa named by Émile Louis Ragonot